is a 1998 Japanese film. It is a sequel to the 1998 film Ring. It is directed by Jōji Iida and is based on the novel of the same title by Koji Suzuki. It is titled The Spiral (stylized as the Spiral) in English on the Japanese poster and video packaging, and it was previously released in North America as Rasen (a transliteration of the Japanese title) and in the United Kingdom, Ireland, and the Philippines as The Spiral.

Ring and its sequel Spiral were released in Japan at the same time. The studio hoped this would increase revenues, because the Ring story was already a successful novel and television film. The two films shared a few cast members and had the same production team, but different directors and screenwriters; Spiral was written and directed by Jōji Iida whereas Ring was written by Hiroshi Takahashi and directed by Hideo Nakata. After their release, Ring became an enormous success while Spiral floundered, quickly becoming the "forgotten sequel".

Takahashi and Nakata were later recruited to produce another sequel, Ring 2, which replaced Spiral as the sequel to Ring, not based on Suzuki's works, and thus ultimately ignores the story of Spiral.

Plot
Following the events of Ring, the body of Ryūji Takayama, former husband of Reiko Asakawa and father of Yōichi Asakawa, is examined by his friend and rival, pathologist Mitsuo Andō. After he finds a cryptic note in Takayama's stomach, Reiko and Yōichi also turn up dead. Andō soon learns of a mysterious cursed videotape, haunted by the spirit of a murdered young woman. Rumor has it that anyone who watches the video will die exactly one week later. Despondent over the death of his own child, and believing that he is being guided by his rival's ghost, Andō decides to see the video for himself. After watching the tape, strange things begin to happen around him, and he soon discovers that the tape's restless spirit has different plans in store for him.

With the help of Takayama's student, Mai Takano, Andō finds out more about Ryūji's past as well as the mysterious young woman, Sadako Yamamura. Searching for the truth about why Ryūji and Yōichi died from the virus while Reiko did not leads him to her boss Yoshino. Yoshino lets Andō in on a secret: he has the wife's diary. She and Ryūji had been researching the cursed videotape. While Reiko had broken the curse, Ryūji died a week after watching the tape. Reiko believed that creating a copy would break the curse, but Yōichi died a week after watching the tape, just as his father had. Yoshino shows Andō both the tape and the diary.

When Andō tells Mai Takano what he has done, she is shocked and cannot understand why, since she felt from the start that it was the video that killed Takayama and his family. As they are talking, Yoshino calls Andō. He admits that he wishes that he had never been involved in Reiko's business. Andō believes that Yoshino had watched the video, but he denies it, saying that he was too scared to. However, Yoshino still dies.

Andō decides to destroy the videotapes and make sure that he will be the video's last victim. He then confides in Mai about his son's death, and they end up sleeping together. Andō asks Mai if she will be there with him when he dies, but Mai tells him that she is too scared. He understands and decides to try to find out more about the virus that killed Takayama and his son. He discovers that the virus that killed Yoshino was different from the one that killed the father and son. Andō asks for tests to be run on him.

Meanwhile, Mai Takano goes missing and Andō apparently survives the curse. He starts to feel that the story was just a myth and he is relieved when Mai turns up, but is shocked to find out that she has been found dead, having given birth with no sign of a baby. Andō goes back to work and sees "Mai" there and finds out that she is none other than Sadako Yamamura, reborn and claiming to be "perfectly dual-gendered". He then learns that Takayama was not helping Andō stop Sadako – instead, he was helping Sadako. Yoshino, Andō's friend Miyashita and many others were not killed by a virus or the video, but rather Reiko's diary. Sadako promises to help resurrect Andō's son in exchange for his help.

In the end, Andō brings Takayama and his son back to life with help from Sadako. Just as Ryūji leaves, he tells Andō: "Many years will pass before our world will be at peace".

Cast
 Kōichi Satō as Mitsuo Andō
 Miki Nakatani as Mai Takano
 Hinako Saeki as Sadako Yamamura
 Shingo Tsurumi as Miyashita
 Shigemitsu Ogi as Maekawa Keibuho
 Yutaka Matsushige as Yoshino
 Daisuke Ban as Heihachiro Ikuma
 Naoaki Manabe as Kobayashi
 Hiroyuki Sanada as Ryūji Takayama

Release
Spiral was released theatrically in Japan on January 31, 1998 where it was distributed by Toho. In the Philippines, the film was given a limited release as The Spiral on February 25, 2004.

The film was released directly to DVD by DreamWorks in the United States on August 23, 2005, under the transliterated title Rasen.

It was released in high definition on Blu-ray Disc and video on demand in the United States, Canada, the United Kingdom and Ireland by Arrow Films under their Arrow Video imprint, under the title Spiral. Spiral was also included in Arrow Video's Ring Collection Blu-ray box set.

See also
 List of Japanese films of 1998
 List of horror films of 1998

References

Bibliography

External links
 
 
 

1998 films
1990s Japanese-language films
1998 horror films
Films scored by Yoshihiro Ike
Japanese ghost films
Japanese horror films
Japanese sequel films
Japanese supernatural horror films
The Ring (franchise)
Toho films
1990s Japanese films